Sotiris Leontiou (Greek: Σωτήρης Λεοντίου, born 17 July 1984) is a retired Greek footballer who coaches for P.O. Psychikou academies. He played as defensive midfielder or as a left full back.

Career
He started his playing career when he was a teenager in the Panathinaikos F.C. Academies. After spending some years in Panathinaikos as an amateur he was finally given a chance to prove his worth as he was given on loan to FC Marko Markopoulo for 2 seasons (2001–2003). While playing for FC Marko he played a total of 38 league matches and scored 11 goals. In the 04/05 season he was given again on loan, this time in Proodeftiki FC and played 26 matches and scored 2 goals.

At the beginning of the 05/06 season, he returned to Panathinaikos first team where he signed a new 5-year contract and became an integral part of the team in the Greek Superleague.

Unfortunately his promising career stopped dramatically in the first day of the 2007–08 season in a derby against Olympiakos when a torn ligament injury sidelined him for two full seasons. The knee was damaged (torn posterior cruciate ligament, lateral collateral ligament rupture, ruptured popliteal tendon, torn posterior bursa and torn medical and lateral meniscus of the left knee) and was described by experts as the most serious injury in the recent years. He returned in training around January 2009 but he failed to appear in any games.

At his 1-year loan spell in Kavala FC in 09–10, he managed to earn his first cap against PAOK FC, playing for 9 minutes. He returned at the end of the 09/10 season on the Panathinaikos roster and was again loaned at Ilioupoli F.C. for the 2010–2011 season. For the next two seasons, he played for Football League clubs Apollon Smyrnis and Fostiras. In the 2012–13 season, playing for Apollon Smyrnis he managed to win the Football League championship.

On 15 September 2014, Thesprotos announced the player for a year contract. On 4 February 2016, he signed a year contract with Egaleo. On 22 July 2016, playing only 152' with the club, he solved his contract.

Honours
Panathinaikos
Super League Greece: 2009–10
Greek Cup: 2009–10

References

External links
 
 Myplayer.gr Profile
 Onsports.gr Profile

1984 births
Living people
Greek footballers
Super League Greece players
Panathinaikos F.C. players
Proodeftiki F.C. players
Kavala F.C. players
Fostiras F.C. players
Ilioupoli F.C. players
Apollon Smyrnis F.C. players
Egaleo F.C. players
Association football defenders
Association football midfielders
Footballers from Ioannina